Csaba Hegedűs (born 26 October 1985 in Pásztó) is a Hungarian football player. He plays for Taksony SE.
He played his first league match in 2013.

Honours
Mezőkövesd
NB II Kelet (1): 2012–13

References

External links

1985 births
Living people
People from Pásztó
Hungarian footballers
Association football defenders
Soroksári TE footballers
Vác FC players
Mezőkövesdi SE footballers
Nemzeti Bajnokság I players
Nemzeti Bajnokság II players
Sportspeople from Nógrád County